Ruairí Ó Gadhra, King of Sliabh Lugha, died 1206. 

The Annals of the Four Masters appear to contain one of the few reference to Ruairí, reporting that Rory O'Gara, Lord of Sliabh Lugha, died in the year 1206.

External links

 http://www.ucc.ie/celt/published/T100010A/index.html

People from County Mayo
12th-century Irish monarchs